Brendan Dean Steele (born April 5, 1983) is an American professional golfer. He played predominantly on the PGA Tour, where he had three tournament victories, prior to joining LIV Golf in 2023.

Early years
Born in Idyllwild, California, Steele played high school golf at Hemet High school and college golf at the University of California, Riverside, graduating in 2005.

Professional career
Steele turned professional in 2005 and played on the Golden State Tour in California, winning four times. He played on the Canadian Tour in 2006 and 2007, where his best finish was second at the 2006 Telus Edmonton Open. This win moved him from thirtieth to sixth on the money list and earned him a PGA Tour card for the 2011 season.

PGA Tour
On April 17, 2011, the week after the Masters, Steele notched his first PGA Tour win at the Valero Texas Open at San Antonio. He holed a  par-saving putt at the final hole to finish a stroke ahead of runners-up Kevin Chappell and Charley Hoffman. Steele was the third tour rookie to win in 2011, after Jhonattan Vegas (Bob Hope Classic) and Charl Schwartzel (Masters). In addition to a  payday and a tour card until the end of 2013, Steele's victory earned invites to The Players Championship, Bridgestone Invitational, PGA Championship, and the next year's Masters; the win moved from 115th to 19th in the FedEx Cup standings.

Over five years later on October 16, 2016, Steele won the Safeway Open in Napa, California, the first event of 2017 season. His winning score of  tied the tournament record for lowest score relative to par; he was one stroke ahead of runner-up Patton Kizzire for his second tour win.

Steele successfully defended his Safeway Open title on October 8, 2017. With his third tour victory, Steele became the first with multiple wins at the event. Later that night,  wildfires damaged the Silverado resort.

LIV Golf
Steele played nine tournaments on the 2022–23 PGA Tour before joining LIV Golf in February 2023, as a member of Phil Mickelson's HyFlyers GC team.

Personal life
Steele is the nephew of Anthony Geary, the actor who plays Luke Spencer of General Hospital.

Professional wins (10)

PGA Tour wins (3)

PGA Tour playoff record (0–1)

Nationwide Tour wins (1)

Nationwide Tour playoff record (1–0)

Other wins (6)
2005 Four wins (Golden State Tour)
2011 Franklin Templeton Shootout (with Keegan Bradley), Straight Down Fall Classic (with Greg Wells)

Playoff record
LIV Golf League playoff record (0–1)

Results in major championships
Results not in chronological order in 2020.

CUT = missed the half-way cut
"T" indicates a tie for a place
NT = No tournament due to COVID-19 pandemic

Summary

Most consecutive cuts made – 3 (2014 PGA – 2016 U.S. Open)
Longest streak of top-10s – 1 (once, current)

Results in The Players Championship

CUT = missed the halfway cut
"T" indicates a tie for a place
C = Canceled after the first round due to the COVID-19 pandemic

Results in World Golf Championships
Results not in chronological order before 2015.

QF, R16, R32, R64 = Round in which player lost in match play
"T" = Tied

See also
2010 Nationwide Tour graduates

References

External links

American male golfers
PGA Tour golfers
Korn Ferry Tour graduates
Golfers from California
University of California, Riverside alumni
Sportspeople from Riverside County, California
Sportspeople from Irvine, California
1983 births
Living people